The 2010–11 season was APOEL's 71st season in the Cypriot First Division and 83rd year in existence as a football club.

The first training session for the season took place on June 14, 2010 at GSP Stadium. On June 20, the team left Cyprus and moved to Obertraun in Austria to perform the main stage of their pre-season training and returned to Cyprus on July 4, 2010.

The team finished 2nd in the Cypriot championship the previous season and as such entered the UEFA Europa League 2010–11 second qualifying round. During the 2010–11 season APOEL reached the Europa League Play-off round being eliminated by Getafe CF 2–1 on aggregate, eliminated in the 2nd round of Cypriot Cup by Apollon 3–1 on aggregate, but finished the season with an emphatic way by winning the Championship four games before the end of the season, creating that day an advantage of 15 points from its main competitor and arch rivals Omonoia.

Current squad
Last Update: January 6, 2011

For recent transfers, see List of Cypriot football transfers summer 2010.
 Also, see List of Cypriot football transfers winter 2010–11.

Squad changes

In:

Total expenditure:  €1M

Out:

Total income:  €0
{|

Squad stats

Top scorers

Last updated: May 14, 2011
Source: Match reports in Competitive matches

Captains
  Marinos Satsias
  Chrysis Michael
  Constantinos Charalambides
  Marios Elia
  Hélio Pinto

Club

Management

Kit

|
|
|

Other information

Pre-season friendlies

Mid-season friendlies

Competitions

Overall

Marfin Laiki League

Classification

Results summary

Results by round

Playoffs table
The first 12 teams are divided into 3 groups. Points are carried over from the first round.

Group A

Matches
All times for the Domestic Competitions at EET

Regular season

Playoffs

UEFA Europa League

Qualifying phase

Second qualifying round

APOEL won 6–1 on aggregate.

Third qualifying round

APOEL won 4–1 on aggregate.

Play-off round

Getafe won 2–1 on aggregate.

Cypriot Cup

Second round

Apollon won 3–1 on aggregate.

References

2010-11
Cypriot football clubs 2010–11 season